Diplomatic relations exist between Armenia and Mexico. Both nations are members of the United Nations.

History 

A month after the dissolution of the Soviet Union in December 1991; Armenia and Mexico established formal diplomatic relations with each other on 14 January 1992. Since the beginning, relations between both nations have been kept on a rather low level and held mainly when relating to diplomatic issues on a global level at the United Nations. In March 2002, Armenian Prime Minister Andranik Margaryan came to the norther Mexican city of Monterrey to attend the Monterrey Consensus Conference; this visit becoming the first and highest level Armenian government official to visit Mexico since independence. In August 2002, Armenian foreign minister Vartan Oskanian paid an official visit to Mexico. During his visit, both nations signed agreements on cooperation in the fields of culture and education as well as an agreement to abolish visas for official and diplomatic passport holders.

In October 2012, Armenian foreign minister Eduard Nalbandyan paid and official visit to Mexico. During his visit, foreign minister Nalbandyan expressed his concerns over Mexico's recognition in 2011 of the Khojaly Massacre where approximately 161 ethnic Azeri's civilians were killed in the town of Khojaly in February 1992 during the First Nagorno-Karabakh War. Foreign Minister Nalbandyan was also concerned with a proposed placing of a statue commemorating former Azeri President Heydar Aliyev on Mexico's main Paseo de la Reforma. After much opposition from human rights groups in Mexico, the statue of President Alliyev was removed and relocated to a private home. During his visit to Mexico, Foreign Minister Nalbandyan addressed the Mexican Senate where he spoke about improving diplomatic relations between both nations and that Armenia would be opening an embassy in Mexico. In early 2014, Armenia opened an embassy in Mexico City.

In April 2015, the Mexican Senate held an Armenian cultural week dedicated to Armenian history and to commemorate 23 years of diplomatic relations between both nations.  In November 2017, two Mexican Congressional Deputies, while on an official visit to Armenia as part of the Mexico-Armenia Friendship Group on the invitation of the Armenian government; visited the disputed territory of Nagorno-Karabakh which is occupied by Armenian forces and located within Azerbaijan. Their visit was not sanctioned by the Mexican Government and created a diplomatic flare-up between Azerbaijan and Mexico.

In June 2019, Mexico opened an honorary consulate in Yerevan.

On 8 February 2023, the Mexican Senate adopted a document recognizing the Armenian genocide committed by Ottoman forces in 1915, citing the need to protect universal human rights.

High-level visits
High-level visits from Armenia to Mexico
 Prime Minister Andranik Margaryan (2002)
 Foreign Minister Vartan Oskanian (2002)
 Foreign Minister Eduard Nalbandyan (2012)

High-level visits from Mexico to Armenia
 Congress member Margarita Blanca Cuata (2017)
 Congress member Carlos Hernández (2017)

Bilateral agreements
Both nations have signed a few bilateral agreements such as a Memorandum of Understanding for the Establishment of Political Consultations on Issues of Mutual Interest (1993); Agreement for the Establishment of Visa Free Regime with respect to Diplomatic and Service Passports Holders (2002) and an Agreement on Cooperation in the fields of Culture and Education (2002).

Trade
In 2018, two-way trade between both nations amounted to US$1.7 million. Armenia's main exports to Mexico include: cable boxes, electrical circuits and parts and accessories for x-ray machines. Mexico's main exports to Armenia include: three wheel motorcycles, beer, tequila, dried fruit and coffee.

Resident diplomatic missions 
 Armenia has an embassy in Mexico City.
 Mexico is accredited to Armenia from its embassy in Moscow, Russia and maintains an honorary consulate in Yerevan.

See also
 Foreign relations of Armenia
 Foreign relations of Mexico 
 Armenian Mexicans
 Armenian genocide recognition

References

 
Mexico
Bilateral relations of Mexico